Echt may refer to:

 Echt, Aberdeenshire, a village in Scotland
 Echt-Susteren, a municipality in the Netherlands
 Echt, Netherlands, a city in the municipality
Echt railway station
 Echt (band), a 1997–2002 German pop group
 Echt (Martian crater)